Oluwatosin "Tosin" Otubajo (born 16 July 1984) is a Nigerian former footballer who played as a defender for the Nigeria women's national team.

Career
Otubajo was a native of Ajegunle, Lagos, and played as a defender for Flying Angel, Vero Bims Queens Lagos, Confluence Queens and Bayelsa Queens. She was a member of the Nigeria national team, and was included in Nigeria's training camp for the 2000 Summer Olympics in Sydney, Australia. However, she was ultimately cut from the squad. Eight years later, she was included in Nigeria's squad at the 2008 Summer Olympics as an alternate player.

References

External links
 

1984 births
Living people
Sportspeople from Lagos
Nigerian women's footballers
Nigeria women's international footballers
Women's association football defenders
Confluence Queens F.C. players
Bayelsa Queens F.C. players